Craig Stephen Way (born 1960) is the current play-by-play announcer for the Texas Longhorns sports network.  He does live radio play-by-play coverage for all major Texas Longhorn sports such as Longhorn football, men's and women's basketball and baseball. Additionally, he serves as a host on High School Scoreboard Live on Fox Sports Southwest.

As the voice of the Longhorns, Craig has had the opportunity to cover several large sporting events, including the 2006 Rose Bowl, in which Texas won college football's National Championship. He has also covered Texas in the 2003 Final Four along with two baseball National Championships for Texas in the College World Series in 2002 and 2005.

References

1960 births
College football announcers
College basketball announcers in the United States
College baseball announcers in the United States
High school football announcers in the United States
Living people
Texas Longhorns
Texas Longhorns baseball announcers
Texas Longhorns men's basketball announcers
Texas Longhorns football announcers
University of Texas at Austin people
Women's college basketball announcers in the United States
American radio sports announcers